In mathematics, the Feller–Tornier constant CFT is the density of the set of all positive integers that have an even number of distinct prime factors raised to a power larger than one (ignoring any prime factors which appear only to the first power).
It is named after William Feller (1906–1970) and Erhard Tornier (1894–1982)

Omega function

The Big Omega function is given by

 

See also: Prime omega function.

The Iverson bracket is

 

With these notations, we have

Prime  zeta  function

The prime zeta function P is give by

 

The Feller–Tornier constant satisfies

See also
Riemann zeta function
L-function
Euler product
Twin prime

References

Mathematical constants
Zeta and L-functions
Infinite products